Denis Maksimovich Talalay (born 10 February 1992) is a Russian football midfielder who plays for FC Volgar Astrakhan.

Club career
He made his debut in the Russian Second Division for FC MITOS Novocherkassk on 17 August 2013 in a game against FC Gazprom transgaz Stavropol Ryzdvyany.
 
He made his Russian Football National League debut for FC Khimki on 8 July 2017 in a game against FC Rotor Volgograd.

Talalay left FC Pyunik at the end of his contract on 14 June 2019.

References

External links
 
 

1992 births
Footballers from Moscow
Living people
Russian footballers
Association football midfielders
FC Moscow players
FC Mika players
FC Zenit-Izhevsk players
FC Khimki players
FC Pyunik players
FC Tom Tomsk players
FC Neftekhimik Nizhnekamsk players
FC Volgar Astrakhan players
Russian First League players
Russian Second League players
Armenian Premier League players
Russian expatriate footballers
Expatriate footballers in Armenia
Russian expatriate sportspeople in Armenia